Cladophora socialis is a species of green algae.

Distribution
Cladophora socialis is found in many locations over the world including the Atlantic Ocean and Pacific Ocean.

References

External links 
 

Cladophoraceae
Taxa named by Friedrich Traugott Kützing